Chloë Sevigny is an American actress and director who made her film debut in the controversial 1995 drama Kids, portraying a teenage girl in inner-city New York who discovers she is HIV-positive. She went on to appear in several independent features, including two directed by her then-boyfriend, Harmony Korine (writer of Kids): Gummo (1997) and Julien Donkey-Boy (1998), before obtaining a lead role as Lana Tisdel in Boys Don't Cry (1999), a fact-based drama about the murder of trans man Brandon Teena. The film earned her numerous accolades, including an Academy Award nomination for Best Supporting Actress.

She went on to have numerous supporting roles in the early 2000s in such films as American Psycho (2000); Party Monster and Dogville (both 2003); and a lead role in the controversial independent film The Brown Bunny (also 2003), for which she received significant press coverage and criticism for performing on-screen unsimulated oral sex on the film's male lead and writer-director, Vincent Gallo. In 2006, Sevigny was cast in the HBO series Big Love, portraying Nicolette Grant, a fundamentalist Mormon who practices polygamy in 21st-century Utah. The series spanned a total of five seasons, for the third of which she earned a Golden Globe Award for Best Supporting Actress.

After the conclusion of Big Love in 2011, Sevigny appeared again in television, guest-starring on Portlandia (2013) as well as appearing in central roles on two seasons of American Horror Story: Asylum (2012) and Hotel (2015). In 2017, she had a supporting role in the drama Lean on Pete, followed by a lead role portraying Lizzie Borden in the drama Lizzie (2018). Sevigny made her directorial debut with the short film Kitty, which premiered at the 2016 Cannes Film Festival, followed by the short film Carmen, which she directed for a 2017 Miu Miu campaign. In 2019, she appeared in a lead role in Jim Jarmusch's zombie comedy The Dead Don't Die, and in the drama The True Adventures of Wolfboy.

Film

Television

Music videos

References 

American filmographies
Actress filmographies